The Remix Wars: Strike 3 – 16volt vs. Hate Dept. is the third remix album released by 21st Circuitry Records. It features three songs by each artist, remixed by the other artist. "Stiched" was originally recorded for 16 Volt's second album Skin. "Dreams of Light" and "Motorskill" were both originally recorded for their first album Wisdom. All three songs by the Hate Dept. ("Defensive", "Start Digging" and "Drive:a") came from their debut album meat.your.maker.

Reception
Black Monday criticized the misdirection of the remixes and said "I'd have to say that this release is a bit disappointing, but the
tracks that are good are real nice to have."

Track listing

Release history

References

External links 
 
 
 

16volt albums
Hate Dept. albums
1997 remix albums
21st Circuitry albums
Off Beat (label) albums
Industrial remix albums